Giuseppe Marsigli (Naples, 1795 - circa 1835) was an Italian painter and engraver.

Biography
He was a pupil of Costanzo Angelini in design, Giuseppe Cammarano in color. His brother Filippo Marsigli was also a painter. He participated in restorations in Naples. He engraved silverware.

References

1795 births
1835 deaths
19th-century Italian painters
Italian male painters
Italian engravers
Painters from Naples
Year of birth unknown
19th-century Italian male artists